The Lexington Avenue/59th Street station (signed as 59th Street–Lexington Avenue) is a New York City Subway station complex shared by the IRT Lexington Avenue Line and the BMT Broadway Line. It is located at Lexington Avenue between 59th and 60th Streets, on the border of Midtown and the Upper East Side of Manhattan. The station complex is the fourteenth-busiest in the system, with over 21 million passengers in 2016.

In addition, the <6> express train stops here during weekdays in peak direction.

A free out-of-system MetroCard/OMNY transfer is available to the 63rd Street Lines ( and  trains, as well as rush-hour  and  trains) by exiting the station and walking to the Lexington Avenue–63rd Street station.

History

Construction and planning

Lexington Avenue Line station
Following the completion of the original subway, there were plans to construct a line along Manhattan's east side north of 42nd Street. The original plan for what became the extension north of 42nd Street was to continue it south through Irving Place and into what is now the BMT Broadway Line at Ninth Street and Broadway. In July 1911, the IRT had withdrawn from the talks, and the Brooklyn Rapid Transit Company (BRT) was to operate on Lexington Avenue. The IRT submitted an offer for what became its portion of the Dual Contracts on February 27, 1912.

In 1913, as part of the Dual Contracts, which were signed on March 19, 1913, the Public Service Commission planned to split the original Interborough Rapid Transit Company (IRT) system from looking like a "Z" system (as seen on a map) to an "H"-shaped system. The original system would be split into three segments: two north–south lines, carrying through trains over the Lexington Avenue and Broadway–Seventh Avenue Lines, and a west–east shuttle under 42nd Street. This would form a roughly "H"-shaped system. It was predicted that the subway extension would lead to the growth of the Upper East Side and the Bronx.

The Lexington Avenue Line station at 59th Street opened on July 17, 1918, with service initially running between Grand Central–42nd Street station and 167th Street via the line's local tracks. On August 1, the "H system" was put into place, with through service beginning on the new east and west side trunk lines, and the institution of the 42nd Street Shuttle along the old connection between the sides. The cost of the extension from Grand Central was $58 million.

Broadway Line station
The New York Public Service Commission adopted plans for what was known as the Broadway–Lexington Avenue route on December 31, 1907. This route began at the Battery and ran under Greenwich Street, Vesey Street, Broadway to Ninth Street, private property to Irving Place, and Irving Place and Lexington Avenue to the Harlem River. After crossing under the Harlem River into the Bronx, the route split at Park Avenue and 138th Street, with one branch continuing north to and along Jerome Avenue to Woodlawn Cemetery, and the other heading east and northeast along 138th Street, Southern Boulevard, and Westchester Avenue to Pelham Bay Park. In early 1908, the Tri-borough plan was formed, combining this route, the under-construction Centre Street Loop Subway in Manhattan and Fourth Avenue Subway in Brooklyn, a Canal Street subway from the Fourth Avenue Subway via the Manhattan Bridge to the Hudson River, and several other lines in Brooklyn.

The Brooklyn Rapid Transit Company submitted a proposal to the Commission, dated March 2, 1911, to operate the Tri-borough system (but under Church Street instead of Greenwich Street), as well as a branch along Broadway, Seventh Avenue, and 59th Street from Ninth Street north and east to the Queensboro Bridge; the Canal Street subway was to merge with the Broadway Line instead of continuing to the Hudson River. The city, the BRT, and the Interborough Rapid Transit Company (which operated the first subway and four elevated lines in Manhattan) came to an agreement, and sent a report to the New York City Board of Estimate on June 5, 1911. The line along Broadway to 59th Street was assigned to the BRT, while the IRT obtained the Lexington Avenue line, connecting with its existing route at Grand Central–42nd Street. Construction began on Lexington Avenue on July 31, and on Broadway the next year. The Dual Contracts, two operating contracts between the city and the BMT and IRT, were adopted on March 4, 1913.

Unused construction is also present near the west end of the Queensboro Bridge. The original plan there was to build two one-track tunnels under 59th and 60th Streets, rising onto the bridge to Queens. However, on July 28, 1915, the Public Service Commission approved a change of plans requested by the New York City Board of Estimate to place both tracks under 60th Street and cross the East River in the 60th Street Tunnel, because of concern whether or not the bridge could handle the weight of all-steel subway trains. A piece of the 59th Street tunnel had already been built, concurrent with the construction of the IRT Lexington Avenue Line, and became a walkway connecting the two side platforms of the IRT's 59th Street station.

This station opened on September 1, 1919 as the new terminal of the Broadway Line with an extension of the line from 57th Street–Seventh Avenue station. This station ceased to be the line's terminal with the extension of the line to Queensboro Plaza through the 60th Street Tunnel on August 1, 1920.

Station renovations
The IRT station originally served local trains only. In Fiscal Year 1930, a crossunder under the local tracks was opened, connecting the southbound and northbound platforms. This passageway was funded by Bloomingdale's and was dedicated on November 11, 1930. The city government took over the BMT's operations on June 1, 1940, and the IRT's operations on June 12, 1940.

On November 4, 1954, the New York City Transit Authority (NYCTA) approved plans to convert 59th Street into an express station. The project was proposed by the executive director of the NYCTA, Sidney Bingham, to improve connections between the Lexington Avenue Line and the Broadway Line. Construction was expected to take two years and cost $5 million. The new express stop was expected to reduce transfer congestion at Grand Central–42nd Street. Even before the express platforms were added, this station was the busiest on the line.

Construction for the express station began on August 10, 1959. Along with the new express platforms, a new mezzanine was built above it to connect it to the local station, and the Broadway Line station. Two high speed escalators were added to connect the local and express platforms. Two additional high speed escalators were built to connect the local platforms with the new mezzanine. The express station opened three months earlier than originally planned. As part of the plan, the local platforms were extended to accommodate 10-car trains. In addition, new entrances and booths were added to the 59th Street ends of the northbound and southbound sides. The whole cost of the project was $6.5 million. Work on the express station at 59th Street, required express trains to run local during late nights. The express platforms were opened on November 15, 1962.

The Third Avenue entrance to the Broadway Line platform was constructed during the early 1970s as part of a project to extend the station's platform to accommodate ten-car trains. The entrance, which opened in October 1973, has the same red tile that was used during renovation of Bowling Green in 1978. It has up and down escalators and an adjoining staircase, and is open part-time only, with four street staircases on Third Avenue.

In 2002, the Broadway Line station received a major overhaul. The Metropolitan Transportation Authority (MTA) repaired the staircases, re-tiled the walls, added new tiling on the floors, upgraded the station's lights and the public address system, and installed ADA yellow safety threads along the platform edge, new signs, and new trackbeds in both directions. The original late 1910s tiling at the Lexington Avenue Line local platforms and the Broadway Line platform being restored, and the original tiling at the Lexington Avenue Line express platforms being covered up with new tiling. Despite the repairs, the project did not make the station ADA-accessible.

In 2019, the MTA announced that the station would become ADA-accessible as part of the agency's 2020–2024 Capital Program.

Station layout

The center level is located at the 60th Street/Lexington Avenue end. Installed in conjunction with the 1962 opening of the lower level IRT express platforms, it allows transfer between all routes. There are three staircases up to the BMT platform, two down to each of the lower level IRT  express platforms, and one staircase and escalator up to the IRT local platforms on the upper level.

Artwork
The mezzanine between the IRT express platforms and the BMT platform has a large-scale mosaic mural entitled Blooming (1996), by Elizabeth Murray. It covers all four walls of the mezzanine area. It takes its name from the nearby Bloomingdale's department store. The mosaic features larger versions of the coffee cups and slippers found on the platform walls, with the text: "In dreams begin responsibilities" and "Conduct your blooming in the noise and whip of the whirlwind".  The text floats from the coffee cups and are excerpted from poetry by Delmore Schwartz and Gwendolyn Brooks. Additional, mini shoe mosaics can be found on the IRT express platforms.

This is one of two murals Murray made for MTA Arts & Design; the other, Stream, can be found at Court Square/23rd Street.

Entrances and exits
The complex has a total of 11 staircase entrances. There are staircases to the Broadway Line platform and that are signed for the northbound Lexington Avenue Line platform at the eastern corners of 60th Street and Lexington Avenue, and staircases to the Broadway Line platform and that are signed for the southbound Lexington Avenue Line platform at the western corners of 60th Street and Lexington Avenue. Staircases from the southbound Lexington Avenue Line platform lead to the southwestern and northwestern corners of Lexington Avenue and 59th Street, while there are two exits to the southeastern corner of that intersection from the northbound platform, with one leading directly to the street, and one located in a passageway to Bloomingdale's. The station also has staircases to all four corners of Third Avenue and 60th Street, leading to a mezzanine with escalators for the Broadway Line platform.

IRT Lexington Avenue Line platforms 

The 59th Street station on the IRT Lexington Avenue Line is an express station. It has two stacked levels, each of which has two tracks and two side platforms. The upper level is used by local trains, and the lower level is used by express trains. The levels are separated by the BMT Broadway Line's platform directly underneath the local platforms and a mezzanine between the BMT platform and the express level. Long escalators connect the local and express platforms directly.

The station used to have all green tile which has been covered up except for one "59th Street" sign near the south end of the northbound platform. There are whimsical stylized mosaics of coffee cups and slippers in varied colors at random spacing near the stairways to the Broadway and IRT local trains. This station was renovated in conjunction with the construction of the Bloomberg Tower at 59th Street and Lexington Avenue. Although a new entrance was constructed within the building, it has remained closed due to fears of icicle formation on a railing that is part of the building's design, directly above the street entrance. A legal battle between the city and the building's management over who is responsible for modifying the design caused the entrance to be temporarily closed between 2003 and 2006.

There is a direct exit to Bloomingdale's from the uptown local platform's fare control (this exit was used in the 2008 film Cloverfield). The underpass near the south end of the station was originally the northbound platform for the extension of the BMT Broadway Line to Queens. That line had been planned as two separate, one-track tunnels, one each under 59th and 60th Streets. Later on, it was decided to alter this layout in favor of a single two-track tunnel under 60th Street. The semi-completed platform under 59th Street was then converted to an underpass between the north and southbound platforms of the Lexington Avenue Line local tracks.

On the upper level, north of the station, there is a storage/lay up track between the two tracks. It ends at a bumper block at its north end. It merges with the two local tracks on its southern end.

Image gallery

BMT Broadway Line platform 

The Lexington Avenue−59th Street station on the BMT Broadway Line has two tracks and one island platform, and two mezzanines. The Lexington Avenue mezzanine has two staircases to each of the IRT local platforms, an escalator to the downtown platform, and three staircases down to the center level.

The distinctive "Lex" mosaics were preserved during the renovation, by installing pre-arranged blocks along the station wall that cup the Lexington Avenue Line above it. The wall tiles have the red "Lex" evenly spaced out, similar to the IND style, with blue background, green borders, and white lettering.

Despite its name, the station is located on Lexington Avenue and 60th Street, one block north of 59th Street. Originally, the Broadway subway was to run to Queens over the Queensboro Bridge. Because the side streets are so narrow, the Queens-bound track was to run under 59th Street and the downtown-bound track under 60th Street. The Broadway subway plan was changed in 1915 to route both tracks into 60th Street and to cross the East River by a tunnel just north of the Queensboro Bridge. The 59th Street crossing was now useless, and at 60th Street, the subway would have to be at a lower grade on its way to the 60th Street Tunnel. The 59th Street crossing was converted into a pedestrian underpass for the IRT station, and is still in use for that purpose; its floor level is that of the never-completed BMT station. The 60th Street crossing was mostly destroyed when the existing station was built at a lower grade. A door in the southern wall across from the platform opens into a remaining unused space, and suggests the platform level of the original grade, which is the same as the 59th Street underpass.

References

External links 

 
 
 nycsubway.org — Blooming Artwork by Elizabeth Murray (1996)
 Station Reporter — 59th Street and Lexington Avenue Complex
 MTA's Arts For Transit — 59 Street/Lexington Avenue — 59th Street

Google Maps Street View:

 Lexington Avenue and 59th Street entrance 
 Lexington Avenue and 60th Street entrance 
 Third Avenue and 60th Street entrance 
 60th Street entrance 
 Upper IRT level 
 Lower IRT level 
 BMT platfom 
 Third Avenue Lobby 

IRT Lexington Avenue Line stations
BMT Broadway Line stations
New York City Subway transfer stations
New York City Subway stations in Manhattan
Upper East Side
Midtown Manhattan
Lexington Avenue
59th Street (Manhattan)